Arne Kåre Nore (born 1946) is a Norwegian businessperson. He was the key architect behind the creation of Pan Fish, and was chief executive officer until 2003, when he was replaced by Atle Eide.

References

1946 births
Living people
Norwegian businesspeople